Riccardo Schicchi (Augusta, Sicily, 12 March 1953 – Rome, 9 December 2012) was an Italian pornographer.

He graduated from art school with a specialization in photography, Schicchi began by being a photographer for a magazine named Epoca, traveling around to several places of the world, including war zones.

After meeting Ilona Staller, both acted as hosts of the radio show Voulez-vous coucher avec moi? featuring discussions about sex, with live calls from the audience. Staller was nicknamed "Cicciolina".

In 1983 the duo founded the model agency Diva Futura.

Moana Pozzi was another source of popularity for Schicchi; Pozzi was the face of Schicchi's "Partito dell'Amore" (Love Party), a party that served parody of other Italian political parties: in 1990, the Love Party was unable to cross over the minimum limit for admission into the lowest Chamber, yet it still amassed a significant number of votes for Pozzi.

Éva Henger was also discovered by Schicchi and later became his wife in 1994. The couple had two children, Mercédesz (1991) and Riccardo Jr. (1995), before separating. Henger currently has another relationship, yet the couple never officially divorced.

Schicchi was ailed with diabetes mellitus type 2, that led to his hospitalization in 2012 for diabetic coma, assisted by Henger. The disease also impaired his vision and caused chronic kidney disease.; Schicchi died in San Pietro Hospital, Rome.

References

1953 births
2012 deaths
People from Augusta, Sicily
Italian film directors
Italian pornographers
Italian pornographic film directors
People with type 2 diabetes
Deaths from diabetes